Somerset Independent School District is a public school district based in Somerset, Texas (USA).

Established in 1920, it is located in Bexar County with a portion of the district extending into Atascosa County. The district currently has approx 4,100 students. Currently lead by Superintendent Dr. Saul Hinojosa

In 2009, the school district was rated "academically acceptable" by the Texas Education Agency.

List of schools
 Somerset High School
 Somerset Junior High School
 Savannah Heights Intermediate School
 SSG Micheal Barrera Veterans Elementary School
 Somerset Elementary School
 Early Childhood Elementary School

References

External links
 Somerset ISD

School districts in Bexar County, Texas
School districts in Atascosa County, Texas